Ethagala (In English: the Elephant Rock) is one of seven rocks that overlook the town of Kurunegala, in Sri Lanka. The rock face reaches  over the town and in its shape resembles a crouching elephant, which explains the rock's name.

Populated places in North Western Province, Sri Lanka
Kurunegala